Oba Thaung, born Thaung Tin (11 April 1898 – 13 January 1971) was an eminent Burmese anyeint dancer and singer, who is credited for codifying the previously undocumented Burmese dance repertory.

She started her dancing career since she was fourteen and had had twenty four years of experiences. In 1953, the State School of Fine Arts was open in Mandalay and Oba Thaung served as first dance instructor for female students.  There, she codified 125 steps of the traditional Burmese choreography, literally named Kabya Lut Aka (Dance without Verse), which consists of five dance courses intended as a five-year term of study. Each of the five courses is broken into 25 dance sequences comprising a total of 125 stages, with each stage of precisely ten minutes.

She was awarded the title Wunna Kyawhtin, the highest honor given to an artist by the Burmese government.

See also
Burmese dance
Anyeint
 Sin Kho Ma Lay
 Yindaw Ma Lay
 Ma Htwe Lay
 Aung Bala
 Liberty Ma Mya Yin
 Mya Chay Gyin Ma Ngwe Myaing

Further reading 
 Oba Thaung: Who Systematized Myanma Dance, Zaw Pale and Khin Win New, (translated to English by Than Tun, 1995)

References

Burmese dancers
20th-century Burmese women singers
1971 deaths
1898 births
Recipients of the Wunna Kyawhtin